Manatawny Creek is an  tributary of the Schuylkill River in Pennsylvania in the United States.

Etymology
The name of the creek comes from the Lenape (or Delaware Indian) term Man'en'tau'wata'wik. Some early sources state that the term translates to "where we drank liquor", but later sources disagree with that interpretation, putting the meaning closer to "here we drink" or "drink-at-uninhabited-place," without reference to liquor.

Course
The tributary Ironstone Creek joins the Manatawny at Pine Forge. Manatawny Creek is formed by the confluence of Bieber Creek and Pine Creek just below Lobachsville.

Manatawny Creek joins the Schuylkill River at Pottstown in Montgomery County.

Bridges
 The Pleasantville Bridge crosses Manatawny Creek at Oley Township in Berks County.

See also
List of rivers of Pennsylvania

References

External links
U.S. Geological Survey: PA stream gaging stations

Rivers of Pennsylvania
Tributaries of the Schuylkill River
Rivers of Montgomery County, Pennsylvania
Rivers of Berks County, Pennsylvania